You Have Been Watching is an Australian television comedy panel discussion and review television program (based upon the UK program of the same name). Hosted by comedian Peter Berner and featuring special guests, the program is produced by the same team behind Balls of Steel Australia. It was commissioned by The Comedy Channel Group Programming Director Darren Chau and premiered on the channel on 17 February 2011, and ranks in the top 5 highest rating local production series in The Comedy Channel's history.

Episodes

References

External links
 

2011 Australian television series debuts
2011 Australian television series endings
Australian comedy television series
The Comedy Channel original programming